Chrysoteuchia hamatella is a moth in the family Crambidae. It was described by Tie-Mei Chen, Shi-Mei Song and De-Cheng Yuan in 2001. It is found in Xizang, China.

References

Crambini
Moths described in 2001
Moths of Asia